Alesani Reservoir or Alesani Lake is a reservoir in the Haute-Corse department of France formed in 1970 by damming the Alesani River with the Alesani Dam . It is the main source of irrigation water along the east coast of Haute-Corse, and it also supplies water for human consumption and for hydroelectric power generation.

Location

The Alesani Reservoir is to the north of Chiatra and east of Pietra-di-Verde.
The Alesani enters the reservoir from the northwest. 
The Spiscia and Mighiarette streams enter from the southwest.
The D517 road crosses the dam at its east end.
The dam is in the commune of Chiatra.

Dam

The dam is faced with asphalt and concrete on the reservoir side.
A  conduit carries water from the bottom outlet through a gallery under the embankment.
Construction lasted from 1964 to 1969.
The dam became operational in 1970.
The reservoir stores water for irrigation and human consumption, and powers a hydroelectric plant.

The reservoir was partly drained and the dam was inspected in 2001.
The bottom valve was totally blocked and the water intake strainer was blocked for more than half its height.
In the autumn the intake was heightened by  using a prefabricated structure.
In August 2020, towards the end of the irrigation season, the Office d'équipment hydraulique de la Corse (OEHC) began to drain  of water from the reservoir, lowering the water level in preparation for further maintenance work.

Distribution of water

The water is used to irrigate the fields, plantations and vineyards of the center of the eastern plain of Corsica.
The Alesani Reservoir supplies water by gravity.
A DN 1200 pipe feeds a DN 900 pipe divided into a north and south branch.
The northern branch interconnects with the Casinca perimeter, which allows gravity feed to the Golo irrigation system outside the intensive irrigation period.
The southern branch is used to feed the Peri Reservoir in winter, and is interconnected with the south sector of the eastern plain, where the Bravone booster is located.
The Peri reservoir has a pumping station that serves the high parts of the Linguizzetta perimeter.

Ecology

The Alesani Reservoir has low biological importance.
Flora include Cretan brake fern (Pteris cretica). 
Fish include brown trout (Salmo trutta).
Invertebrates include copper demoiselle (Calopteryx haemorrhoidalis), willow emerald damselfly (Chalcolestes viridis) and black-tailed skimmer (Orthetrum cancellatum).

Gallery

Notes

Sources

Reservoirs of Haute-Corse